Alpine Township is an inactive township in Stone County, in the U.S. state of Missouri.

Alpine Township was erected in 1890, and so named on account of its lofty elevation.

References

Townships in Missouri
Townships in Stone County, Missouri